Yeorgios Andreou (born 26 July 1974) is a Cypriot athlete. He competed in the men's decathlon at the 2000 Summer Olympics.

References

External links

1974 births
Living people
Athletes (track and field) at the 2000 Summer Olympics
Cypriot decathletes
Olympic athletes of Cyprus
Athletes (track and field) at the 1994 Commonwealth Games
Athletes (track and field) at the 1998 Commonwealth Games
Athletes (track and field) at the 2002 Commonwealth Games
Commonwealth Games competitors for Cyprus
Athletes (track and field) at the 2001 Mediterranean Games
Place of birth missing (living people)
Mediterranean Games competitors for Cyprus